Mau Aima is an industrial town and a nagar panchayat in Allahabad district in the Indian state of Uttar Pradesh.

Location
It is positioned in the north of Allahabad, 30 km on the state highway from Allahabad to Faizabad. Chitpalgarh, Raniganj, Siwaith and Sikandra are some of the towns surrounding Mau Aima. The Mau Aima Railway Station on the Faizabad-Allahabad rail route is the nearest railway station and the Varanasi airport is the nearest airport. The historical town of Shringverpur is located at a distance of 12 km.

Economy
It is  known for the manufacture of cotton, polyester and nylon clothes. The main business of Mau Aima is Power loom.

Demographics
As of 2011 Indian Census, Mau Aima nagar panchayat had a total population of 19,645, of which 10,171 were males and 9,474 were females. Population within the age group of 0 to 6 years was 2,659. The total number of literates in Mau Aima was 13,295	, which constituted 67.7% of the population with male literacy of 72.4% and female literacy of 62.6%. The effective literacy rate of 7+ population of Mau Aima was 78.3%, of which male literacy rate was 83.7% and female literacy rate was 72.5%. The Scheduled Castes population was 1,510. Mau Aima had 2754 households in 2011.

References

Cities and towns in Allahabad district